Horace Fairbanks (March 21, 1820 – March 17, 1888) was an American politician and the 36th governor of Vermont from 1876 to 1878.

Biography
Fairbanks was born in Barnet, Vermont, on March 21, 1820, the third of nine children of Erastus Fairbanks and Lois (Crossman) Fairbanks.  He was educated at schools in Peacham and Lyndon, Vermont, and Meriden, New Hampshire, and completed his education at Phillips Academy in Andover, Massachusetts.

Career
In 1840, Fairbanks became a confidential clerk at E. & T. Fairbanks & Co. his family's St. Johnsbury business, which became famous as the maker of the first platform scale.  He became a partner in 1843 and later became the company's president.  Fairbanks was active in several other business ventures, including construction of the Portland and Ogdensburg Railway from Portland, Maine to Ogdensburg, New York.  Fairbanks was president of the Vermont division of the railroad and president of the First National Bank of St. Johnsbury.

Fairbanks was a delegate to the Republican National Conventions of 1864 and 1868.  In 1868, Fairbanks also one of Vermont's electors in the 1872 presidential election.  In 1869 he was elected to the Vermont State Senate; He served one term, but illness prevented him from attending sessions regularly.  He was a delegate to the 1872 Republican National Convention.

In 1871 Fairbanks presented to St. Johnsbury the St. Johnsbury Athenaeum, which includes a public library and an art gallery.  He was a trustee of the University of Vermont and Phillips Academy.

Elected Governor of Vermont in 1876, Fairbanks served a two-year term.

Fairbanks died in New York City on March 17, 1888.  He is interred at Mount Pleasant Cemetery in St. Johnsbury.

Family
Fairbanks married Mary E. Taylor (1824-1901) on August 9, 1840.  They were the parents of three children, Helen, Agnes, and Isabel.

Fairbanks was the brother of Franklin Fairbanks, who served as Speaker of the Vermont House of Representatives.

References

External links

Horace Fairbanks at The Political Graveyard
Horace Fairbanks at National Governors Association

1820 births
1888 deaths
Phillips Academy alumni
Republican Party Vermont state senators
Republican Party governors of Vermont
People from St. Johnsbury, Vermont
People from Barnet, Vermont
19th-century American politicians
19th-century American philanthropists
19th-century American businesspeople